The 2016–17 LEN Euro Cup was the second tier of European competition in water polo. It ran from 14 October 2016 to 5 April 2017.

Overview

Team allocation

Round and draw dates
The schedule of the competition is as follows.

Qualifying rounds

Qualification round I

Group A
Tournament was played in Aix en Provence, France.

Group B
Tournament was played in Split, Croatia.

Group C
Tournament was played in Košice, Slovakia.

Group D
Tournament was played in Naples, Italy.

Qualification round II

Group E
Tournament was played in Zagreb, Croatia.

Group F
Tournament was played in Naples, Italy.

Knockout stage

Bracket

Quarter-finals

1st leg: 30 November 2016
2nd leg: 10 December 2016

|}

Semi-finals
1st leg: 18 January 2017
2nd leg: 18 February 2017

|}

Final
1st leg: 22 March 2017
2nd leg: 5 April 2017

|}

See also
2016–17 LEN Champions League

References

 
LEN Euro Cup seasons
Euro Cup
2016 in water polo
2017 in water polo